"300X" was the name given to the  6-car experimental Shinkansen train developed in 1994 by the Central Japan Railway Company (JR Central) in Japan to test technology to be incorporated in future shinkansen trains operating at speeds of  or higher.

Design
Manufacture of the train was shared among four different manufacturers, with a number of different body construction methods used. The two ends cars employed differing nose designs, and a number of pantograph shroud designs were tested over the lifetime of the trainset.

Formation

Cars 2 and 5 were fitted with pantographs.

955-1
End car with "cusp" nose design, built by Mitsubishi Heavy Industries. The body was constructed of rivetted Duralumin. This car had no passenger seats.

955-2
The body was constructed by Nippon Sharyo using large hollow aluminium extrusions. This was the only car in the trainset to be fitted with passenger seats.

955-3
This vehicle was constructed by Kawasaki Heavy Industries using spot-welded large aluminium extrusions and was fitted with active tilting.

955-4
This vehicle was constructed by Nippon Sharyo using large hollow aluminium extrusions, similar to car 2, and was equipped with large side doors for installing and removing test equipment.

955-5
This vehicle was constructed by Hitachi using aluminium honeycomb panels. This car had no seats.

955-6
Hitachi-built end car with "wedge" nose design. The body was constructed of brazed aluminium honeycomb panels.

History

The train was unveiled on 22 December 1994.

Test-running on the Tōkaidō Shinkansen was delayed by track damage caused by the Great Hanshin earthquake in January 1995, but full-scale test-running commenced on 25 May 1995, between Maibara and Kyoto.

This record still stands.

The Class 955 trainset was officially withdrawn on 1 February 2002.

Preservation
End car 955-1 is preserved outdoors at the RTRI large-scale wind tunnel test facility in Maibara, Shiga. End car 955-6 was initially preserved inside JR Central's Hamamatsu Works, and was moved to the new SCMaglev and Railway Park in 2010.

References

Experimental and prototype high-speed trains
Hitachi multiple units
Land speed record rail vehicles
Shinkansen train series
Tilting trains
Train-related introductions in 1994
Kawasaki multiple units
25 kV AC multiple units
Nippon Sharyo multiple units